1895 general election  may refer to:
1895 New Brunswick general election
1895 United Kingdom general election